And Who Shall Go to the Ball? And What Shall Go to the Ball? is the fourteenth album by singer and composer Scott Walker, and his second release for 4AD. The album was originally commissioned as a contemporary dance piece for disabled and non-disabled dance company CandoCo, choreographed by Rafael Bonachela.

In a press release from his record label, Walker described the music in the following way: "Apart from a slow movement given over to solitude, the music is full of edgy and staccato shapes or cuts, reflecting how we cut up the world around us as a consequence of the shape of our bodies. How much of a body does an intelligence need to be potentially socialised in an age of ever-developing AI? This is but one of many questions that informed the approach to the project."

The album was issued in just 2500 copies and will, according to the label, never be re-pressed.

Track listing

Personnel 
 London Sinfonietta – orchestra
 Philip Sheppard – cello
 Alasdair Malloy – percussion
 Bradley Grant – saxophone, flute
 Andy Findon – saxophone, flute
 Steven Price – recording
 Matt Paul – engineer
 Mick Taylor – engineer
 Peter Walsh – programming, effects, sound manipulation
 Mark Warman – orchestration, programming, effects

References 

2007 albums
4AD albums
Scott Walker (singer) albums